Romano Canavese is a comune (municipality) in the Metropolitan City of Turin in the Italian region Piedmont, located about  northeast of Turin.

Main sights
Communal Tower (14th century), now turned into a church bell tower, and the surrounding park.
Remains of the Ricetto (fortress)
Church of Santa Marta, in the Ricetto, dating to the 13th century but with a Baroque façade
Villa Bocca

References

External links

 www.comuneromano.it/

Cities and towns in Piedmont
Canavese